Conceptronic is a brand of computer peripherals. As of 2012, the brand name is owned by Digital Data Communications Asia Co., Ltd, which took over 2L Alliance. The company is headquartered in Taipei, Taiwan, with its European Sales Office in Dortmund, Germany.

References

External links 
 Conceptronic website
 European Digital Data Communications website
 LevelOne website
 Equip website

Computer peripheral companies
Dutch brands
Organisations based in Utrecht (province)
Amersfoort